Bruno Zumino (28 April 1923 − 21 June 2014) was an Italian theoretical physicist and faculty member at the University of California, Berkeley. He obtained his DSc degree from the University of Rome in 1945.

He was renowned for his rigorous proof of the CPT theorem with Gerhart Lüders;  his pioneering systematization of effective chiral Lagrangians;  the discoveries, with Julius Wess, of the Wess–Zumino model,  the first four-dimensional supersymmetric quantum field theory with Bose-Fermi degeneracy, and  initiator of the field of supersymmetric radiative restrictions;  a concise formulation of supergravity;
and for his deciphering of  structured flavor-chiral anomalies, codified in the  Wess–Zumino–Witten model of conformal field theory.

Awards
 1985 Membership in the National Academy of Sciences
 1987 Dirac Medal of the ICTP
 1988 Dannie Heineman Prize for Mathematical Physics
 1989 Max Planck Medal
 1992 Wigner Medal
 1992 Humboldt Research Award
 1999 Gian Carlo Wick Commemorative Gold Medal
 2005 Enrico Fermi Prize of the Italian Physical Society

See also
Polyakov action

References

External links
Zumino's faculty page at Berkeley
Zumino's  research page at Berkeley
Biographical outline at the APS
Scientific publications of Bruno Zumino on INSPIRE-HEP
Mary K. Gaillard, "Bruno Zumino", Biographical Memoirs of the National Academy of Sciences (2015)

1923 births
2014 deaths
20th-century Italian physicists
University of California, Berkeley faculty
Members of the United States National Academy of Sciences
Scientists from Rome
Sapienza University of Rome alumni
Theoretical physicists
Mathematical physicists
People associated with CERN
Winners of the Max Planck Medal
Italian expatriates in the United States